Brigadier-General Harold Stephen Langhorne  (17 September 1866 – 26 June 1932) was an officer in the Royal Army Ordnance Corps of the British army and served in India, Burma, Hong Kong, South Africa and France.

Early life 

He was the son of Reverend John Langhorne, headmaster of King's School, Rochester and Henrietta Long of Harston Hall, Harston, Cambridgeshire and Landermere Hall, Thorpe-le-Soken.

He attended Tonbridge School and then went to the King's School, Rochester. He went to the Royal Military Academy, Woolwich, London, England, which was established in 1741 to educate the military branch of the Board of Ordnance to produce officers for the Artillery and Engineers. He entered the Royal Artillery in 1885, and by 1890 served in India.

Family, Marriage and Children

His brother John Langhorne became principal of John Watson's Institution, Edinburgh.  Two of his half-brothers also became senior army officers: Major-General Algernon Philip Yorke Langhorne and Brigadier James Archibald Dunboyne Langhorne.

Harold Stephen Langhorne met his future wife after he fell from a horse during a polo match in India.  In order to recover from the fall he was seated beside her and her father Major General Frederick Edward Hadow, believed to have been a senior officer of the Hyderabad Contingent Force.  He married Amy Helen Francis Hadow (born Toghoo, Bengal 21 December 1867 died Cheltenham, Gloucester, England 17 July 1953) at Allahabad, Uttar Pradesh, India on 28 December 1891.

They had five children:

 Francis Harold Langhorne (born 1892 Aurangabad, Deccan, India), emigrated to Slocan junction, British Columbia and signed up with the Canadian Expeditionary Force at Valcartier on 18 September 1914. He was killed in action at Cambrai on 29 September 1918 whilst a Lieutenant with the 2nd Canadian Mounted Rifles (British Columbia Regiment))

 Ursula Margaret (Peggy) Langhorne (born Ticehurst, Kent in September 1894)

 Edward Walter Langhorne (born 1900 Hong Kong joined the Royal Artillery, served in Mesopotamia and India.  After leaving the army he worked in the 1930s in oil extraction in Trinidad and was present for the Butler riots.  He was present at Guayaguayare and Forest reserve. In the 1950s he worked again in oil extraction for the Ministry of Works Kaduna, Nigeria.  He later lived with his wife Rose at Whitchurch, Hampshire.
 Hilda Mary Langhorne (born Harbledon, Canterbury 15 April 1901 died 1999) lived with her parents in Egypt, joined the ARP in 1939 and worked as an ambulance driver in London during the blitz. She was based at the London Auxiliary Ambulance Station at 39A crawford Street, London.  For this she received the Defence Medal in 1946.  She later became a governess to Sir Sidney Woodwark, physician to Queen Elizabeth.  Late in her retirement she resided at Whaddon and then Brookethorpe, both near Gloucester.

 Elizabeth Langhorne (born 23 October 1911 at the Royal Army Clothing Depot, Pimlico, London died Gloucester 1999).  Elizabeth attended Cheltenham Ladies College from 1925 to 1931, with a scholarship from 1927 to 1930 and was a senior prefect from 1930 to 1931. In 1931 she won the Dorothea Beale exhibition in History to enter St Hilda's College, Oxford and in 1933 won the Mansfield essay prize(open to 1st and 2nd year students in all subjects; for an essay on "The study of Aristotle in the thirteenth century).  She won the University Gibbs Scholarship in history (awarded on the result of a competitive examination) and her College exhibition was raised to a scholarship. She was the first woman to win the Gibbs Scholarship. In 1934 she completed B.A. Final Honour School of modern history, class II.  Her special period was A.D. 919-1273 and special subject The Third Crusade.    In 1934-1935 she undertook the Gamble studentship for research (a college studentship). From 1935-1936 she was a junior lecture in history as Royal Holloway College In 1935 she undertook Post Graduate work under the direction of Professor Powicke.  Her research was on "The problem of the papacy in the twelfth century, with special reference to the preaching of apostolic poverty during the pontificate of Eugenius II".  She was a lecturer in modern history at St Hilda's from 1936 to 1938. From 1938 to 1939 she was a part-time teacher at Cheltenham Ladies college.  From 1941- 1942 she was a National Service interviewer, Stockport.  In 1942 she was appointed part-time to the Staff of the Social Reconstruction Survey organised by Nuffield College, Oxford.  She married Francis Hugh Vowles in 1938, residing at 135 Finlay road, Gloucester.  She was chair of the Gloucestershire local history society.  They later lived at the Old Rectory, Whaddon, Gloucester before dividing this land and building "New Hasbrook" next door.

Career and later life 

Langhorne served in the Royal Artillery, where he was promoted to Captain (1895), Major (1904), Lieutenant-Colonel (1907), and Colonel (1914).  His ordnance formation was as follows:  Ordnance Officer 4th Class 1896–1902, 3rd Class 1902–7, 2nd Class 1907–14, 1st class 1914.

He served in the Hyderabad contingent and, by 1893, in Madras. (ref: The Register of Tonbridge School, from 1820 to 1893 page 206  https://books.google.co.uk/books?id=4b8NAAAAYAAJ&printsec=frontcover#v=onepage&q&f=false) On 1 April 1896 he was seconded for service with the Inspection Branch. He was responsible for supervising munitions in Hong Kong (c. 1900). At the close of the Boer war he was sent to South Africa.  He also worked with munitions at Ormskirk, Lancashire.

Prior to the outbreak of and during the beginning of the first world war he was working and living at the Royal Army Clothing Depot, Grosvenor Road, Pimlico, London.  His daughter, Elizabeth Vowles, who lived there during the first world war described the depot and his role there thus:
he was literally a factory manager, making clothing, from boots and socks up to ceremonial scarlet uniforms... After the Boer war till a scramble to enlist in 1914 it sufficed one clothing factory to keep it (the British Army) clad.  ... By 1915 or so my father, in uniform would bring in his two officers to lunch with us, suggesting pressure in the office.  The factory employed civilians in the sawing shed for packing-cases and women in the sewing rooms. By 1916 we were ejected from the Royal Army Clothing Department and the whole place given up to machines and packing; father must have been busy well before that in organising extended work in the hugh Olympia and the White City.  He was still I suppose working there in 1917 as he was living at home but by 1918 he was constantly away, at first in France behind the lines I suppose laying lines for supply to the Big Push which finally drove the Germans back by November 1918.

He was later sent to Salonika in the East Mediterranean.  According to his daughter the reason for his being there was "presumably the remaining war to control Palestine and Cairo" and its preparations.   "Salonika was the main base, but he certainly went beyond that."

On 29 September 1918 his oldest son Lieutenant Francis Harold Langhorne was killed in action while serving with the 2nd Canadian Mounted Rifles in northern France.  After the first world war he visited the grave at Borlon wood, arranging for an epitaph to be added.

He went to Cairo in 1919 as Deputy Director of Ordnance Supplies for General Edmund Allenby, 1st Viscount Allenby.  Based at Halouan, outside Cairo, and Heliopolis. His postal address was the Eden Palace Hotel, Cairo.  As part of his work he had to travel to Tanta.  In the summer of 1923 his wife suffered a bad bout of typhoid in Cairo. He came home from Cairo and retired to Gloucestershire in 1924 to pursue gardening.

He played polo, cricket and tennis and was a keen pianist, enjoying in particular the works of Sibelius and Debussy. He was interested in the ideas of Ruskin.

He received the following awards:  Commander of the Order of the Bath (1915), Commander of Michael and George (1918).  According to an account of his life left by his daughter he declined a knighthood on the basis that "he didn't like the company he'd be in and above all, wouldn't shake hands with Maundy Gregory for the fear the mud would stick to his!".

Langhorne died in Barnwood, Gloucester, England, 26 June 1932.

Plaque in Rochester Cathedral

A brass plaque was put up in his memory at Rochester Cathedral.  It reads:  "In loving memory of Brig General Harold Stephen Langhorne CB CMG Royal army ordnance corps.  A Kings scholar 1879-1883.  Died 26 June 1932 aged 65".

References 

The personal information on this page has come from the papers of his daughters Mary Langhorne and Elizabeth Vowles née Langhorne, both formerly of the Old Rectory, Whaddon, Gloucestershire, England).

1866 births
1932 deaths
People educated at King's School, Rochester
Graduates of the Royal Military Academy, Woolwich
People from Tonbridge
British Army brigadiers
Royal Artillery officers
British Army personnel of World War I
Royal Army Ordnance Corps officers
Companions of the Order of St Michael and St George
Companions of the Order of the Bath